March 7 - Eastern Orthodox liturgical calendar - March 9

All fixed commemorations below are observed on March 21 by Orthodox Churches on the Old Calendar.

For March 8th, Orthodox Churches on the Old Calendar commemorate the Saints listed on February 23 (February 24 on leap years).

Saints

 Apostle Hermas of the Seventy, Bishop in Philipopoulis (1st century)
 Martyr Dius (Dion, Dionos), by the sword.
 Martyrs Quinctilian and Capatolinus, at Nicomedia.
 Venerable Dometius, reposed in peace (363)
 Hieromartyr Theodoretus, priest, of Antioch (361-363)
 Venerable Paul the Confessor, bishop of Plousias in Bithynia (c. 840)  (see also March 7)
 Saint Theophylactus, Bishop of Nicomedia (842)
 Righteous Tarasius the Wonderworker, of Lycaonia. (see also March 9 and May 7)

Pre-Schism Western saints

 Saint Pontius of Carthage, a Deacon of the Church of Carthage (c. 260)
 Hieromartyr Cyril, a bishop, with martyrs Rogatus, Felix, another Rogatus, Beata, Herenia, Felicitas, Urban, Silvanus and Mamillus, martyrs in North Africa.
 Saint Provinus, Bishop of Como in Italy (c. 420)
 Saint Beoadh (Beatus), Bishop of Ardcarne in Roscommon in Ireland (c. 518)
 Saint Senán mac Geirrcinn (Senames), a monk in Kilmanagh in Ireland (c. 540)
 Saint Felix of Burgundy, Bishop of Dunwich and Enlightener of East Anglia (c. 648)
 Saint Julian of Toledo, Archbishop of Toledo and Confessor (690)
 Saint Humphrey (Hunfrid of Prüm), Bishop of Therouanne in France and was Abbot of St Bertin (871)

Post-Schism Orthodox saints

 Venerable Saints Lazarus (1391) and Athanasius (15th century), monks of Murman Island, Onega Lake, Republic of Karelia.

New martyrs and confessors

 New Hieromartyr John Znamensky, Priest (1923)
 Martyr Vladimir Ushkov (1942)
 Saint Andronicus (Lukash), Schema-Archimandrite of Tbilisi, Georgia, Elder of Glinsk Hermitage (1974)
 New Martyr and Confessor John of Sonkajanranta (Johannes (Ivan) Vasileinpoika Karhapää) (1884–1918)

Other commemorations

 “Kursk Root” Icon of the Sign of the Most Holy Theotokos (“Kurska-Korinna”) (1295){{#tag:ref|This is a copy of the famous “Kursk Root” Icon of the Most Holy Theotokos commemorated on November 27.<ref>Icon of the Mother of God Kursk Root “of the Sign”. OCA - Lives of Saints.</ref>|group=note}}
 Repose of Blessed Basiliscus of Uglich (1863) 
 Repose of Archbishop Vitaly (Maximenko) of Eastern America (1960)

Icon gallery

Notes

References

Sources
 March 8/March 21. Orthodox Calendar (PRAVOSLAVIE.RU).
 March 21 / March 8. HOLY TRINITY RUSSIAN ORTHODOX CHURCH (A parish of the Patriarchate of Moscow).
 March 8. OCA - The Lives of the Saints.
 The Autonomous Orthodox Metropolia of Western Europe and the Americas (ROCOR). St. Hilarion Calendar of Saints for the year of our Lord 2004. St. Hilarion Press (Austin, TX). p. 20.
 March 8. Latin Saints of the Orthodox Patriarchate of Rome.
 The Roman Martyrology. Transl. by the Archbishop of Baltimore. Last Edition, According to the Copy Printed at Rome in 1914. Revised Edition, with the Imprimatur of His Eminence Cardinal Gibbons. Baltimore: John Murphy Company, 1916. pp. 69–70.
Greek Sources
 Great Synaxaristes:  8 ΜΑΡΤΙΟΥ. ΜΕΓΑΣ ΣΥΝΑΞΑΡΙΣΤΗΣ.
  Συναξαριστής. 8 Μαρτίου.'' ECCLESIA.GR. (H ΕΚΚΛΗΣΙΑ ΤΗΣ ΕΛΛΑΔΟΣ).
Russian Sources
  21 марта (8 марта). Православная Энциклопедия под редакцией Патриарха Московского и всея Руси Кирилла (электронная версия). (Orthodox Encyclopedia - Pravenc.ru).
  8 марта (ст.ст.) 21 марта 2013 (нов. ст.). Русская Православная Церковь Отдел внешних церковных связей. (DECR).

March in the Eastern Orthodox calendar